The Sparkill Creek Drawbridge is a historic Pratt Pony Truss drawbridge located at Piermont in Rockland County, New York. It was built in 1880 by the King Iron Bridge Company of Cleveland, Ohio, and is a single-leaf movable metal bridge. Chains can lift the bridge when an operator turns a crank, helped by counterweights. It spans Sparkill Creek, a tributary of the Hudson River.

The bridge was listed on the National Register of Historic Places in 1985 and documented by the Historic American Engineering Record in 1994.

A complete dismantling and restoration for $900,000 was completed in 2009 and the bridge now serves as solely a pedestrian bridge. The Rockland County Highway Department was responsible for this historic restoration.

See also
List of bridges documented by the Historic American Engineering Record in New York (state)

References

External links

Road bridges on the National Register of Historic Places in New York (state)
Historic American Engineering Record in New York (state)
Bridges completed in 1880
Transportation buildings and structures in Rockland County, New York
Pedestrian bridges in New York (state)
Former road bridges in the United States
National Register of Historic Places in Rockland County, New York
Iron bridges in the United States
Pratt truss bridges in the United States